Oil Springs is a village in Lambton County, Ontario, Canada, located along Former Provincial Highway 21 south of Oil City. The village, an enclave within Enniskillen Township, is the site of North America's first commercial oil well. It is home to the Oil Museum of Canada.

History

Before the village was formed, the indigenous people already knew about the gum beds and used the sticky oil to waterproof their canoes. The place, originally called Black Creek, became the site of North America's first commercial oil well when asphalt producer James Miller Williams set out to dig a water well in September 1858 and found free oil instead.

Williams' discovery triggered North America's first oil rush and the village's name was changed to Oil Springs that same year.  Within a few years, Oil Springs was a bustling town with four thousand residents and in its peak days boasted paved roads, horse-drawn buses and street lamps.

John Henry Fairbank, a surveyor turned oil man who came to Oil Springs in 1861, bought some property and despite incurring debts and suffering family tragedies, Fairbank struck it rich, founding the successful Fairbank Oil Company that is now the oldest petroleum company in the world. He also invented the jerker line, a method used to pump oil to the surface from multiple wells using a shared steam engine.  Jerker lines are still used to pump oil in Oil Springs today.

On January 16, 1862, John Shaw using a springboard to chip through rock, created Canada's first oil gusher (located on Gypsie Flats Road). A year later, a plank road was built from Oil Springs to Wyoming rail station.

In 1865, the place separated from Enniskillen Township and was incorporated as a village. Petrolia quickly replaced Oil Springs as Canada's oil capital, leaving Oil Springs almost abandoned.

In 1881, more oil was discovered at a deeper level, resulting in another oil boom for Oil Springs. Two oil pipelines were built to Petrolia, and in 1886, a spur line of the Canada Southern Railway connected the village to Oil City (operating until 1960).

In 1914, Charles Fairbank, son of John Henry, found a gas gusher in Oil Springs that was deemed the biggest gusher in Canada.

In the 1930s, a fire destroyed all of the original oil rigs on William's property and by 1974, the last receiving station of Imperial Oil closed.

In 2008, the 150th anniversary of Williams' discovery, Canada Post issued a stamp commemorating this first commercial oil well, featuring portraits of Charles Tripp and Williams.

Demographics

References

External links 

Villages in Ontario
Lower-tier municipalities in Ontario
Municipalities in Lambton County
Petroleum industry in Canada
1865 establishments in Canada
History of the petroleum industry in Ontario